Events in the year 1986 in Norway.

Incumbents
 Monarch – Olav V
 Prime Minister – Kåre Willoch (Conservative Party) until 9 May, Gro Harlem Brundtland (Labour Party)

Events

 5 March – Eleven Norwegian soldiers are killed in an avalanche near Narvik in Nordland County.
 3 May – Eurovision 1986 is held in Bergen.
 9 May – Gro Harlem Brundtland becomes Prime Minister of Norway for the second time.
 9 May – Brundtland's Second Cabinet was appointed.
 Norsk Hydro acquires Årdal og Sunndal Verk in a merger to create the light metal division Hydro Aluminium.

Popular culture

Sports

Music

Film

Literature

Television

Notable births

10 February – Joakim Hykkerud, handball player.
27 February – Tom Kalsås, politician.
10 March – Jon Aaraas, ski jumper.
7 April – Stine Kufaas, athlete.
18 April – Tina Bru, politician.
22 June – Christian Spanne, handball player.
27 June – Stine Tomb, athlete.
8 July – Gisle Meininger Saudland, politician.
24 July (in Somalia) – Marian Abdi Hussein, politician.
31 August – Elisabeth Slettum, athlete.
8 October – Camilla Herrem, handball player.
9 October – Jan Christian Vestre, businessperson and politician.
26 November – Åshild Bruun-Gundersen, politician.
5 December – Cathrine Larsåsen, athlete.

Notable deaths
5 January – Eivind Sværen, shot putter (born 1917)
15 January – Knut Brynildsen, international soccer player (born 1917)
24 February – Arthur Rydstrøm, gymnast and Olympic silver medallist (born 1896)
26 March – Asbjørn Ruud, ski jumper and World Champion (born 1919)
23 April – Harald Nicolai Samuelsberg, politician (born 1911)
6 May – Toralf Westermoen, engineer, pioneer for the development of high speed craft (born 1914)
19 May – Knut Rød, police officer responsible for the transfer of Jewish people to SS troops in Oslo, acquitted (born 1900)
23 June – Kåre Siem, musician and writer (born 1914).
6 August – Hans-Jørgen Holman, musicologist and educationalist (born 1925)
10 August – Jon Snersrud, skier and Olympic bronze medallist (born 1902)
8 September – Idar Norstrand, civil servant and politician (born 1915)
24 September – Harald Selås, politician (born 1908)
25 September – Hans Vogt, linguist (born 1903)
18 October – Sverre Ingolf Haugli, speed skater and Olympic bronze medallist (born 1925)
22 October – Thorgeir Stubø, jazz guitarist, band leader, and composer (born 1943)
30 October – Olaf Hansen, boxer (born 1906)
31 October – Alfred Hauge, novelist, poet and historian (born 1915)
4 November – Thorolf Rafto, human rights activist and professor in Economic History (born 1922)
15 November – Erling Fjellbirkeland, research administrator (born 1911).
23 November – Olaf Hoffsbakken, Nordic skier, Olympic silver medallist and World Champion (born 1908)
11 December – Olav O. Nomeland, politician (born 1919)
13 December – Jarl Johnsen, boxer (born 1913)
14 December – John Anker Johansen, gymnast and Olympic silver medallist (born 1894)
21 December – Helge Sivertsen, discus thrower, politician and Minister (born 1913)
31 December – Ole Johansen, politician (born 1904)

Full date unknown
Sverre Marstrander, professor in archaeology (born 1910).

See also

References

External links